Giuseppe Fietta (6 November 1883 – 1 October 1960) was an Italian prelate of the Catholic Church who worked in the diplomatic service of the Holy See from 1924 to 1958, including a stint as Apostolic Nuncio to Argentina from 1936 to 1953. He was made a cardinal in 1958.

Biography
Born in Ivrea, Piedmont, Giuseppe Fietta studied at the Pontifical Gregorian University in Rome and was ordained to the priesthood on 4 November 1906. He then served as private secretary to the bishop of Alghero, Oristano, and Cagliari until 1923. Fietta was raised to the rank of Domestic Prelate of His Holiness on 9 May 1920 and served as the rector of the Seminary of Alghero and a canon of its cathedral chapter from 1923 to 1924. Joining the diplomatic service of the Holy See, he worked as secretary of the Nunciature to Costa Rica and in 1925 became chargé d'affaires there.

On 30 March 1926 Pope Pius XI appointed Fietta Titular Archbishop of Serdica and, on 8 July, Apostolic Internuncio to Central America.

He received his episcopal consecration on 10 October that year from Cardinal Giovanni Bonzano in Sacro Cuore di Gesù a Castro Pretorio in Rome.

Fietta was named Nuncio to Haiti and to the Dominican Republic on 18 October 1930. He was replaced in those nunciatures by Maurilio Silvani on 24 July 1936. His term in the Dominican Republic coincided with the first presidency–and the first stages of the dictatorship–of Rafael Trujillo, to whom Fietta was politically sympathetic.

Pope Pius XI appointed him Nuncio to Argentina on 12 August 1936 and Apostolic Nuncio to Paraguay on 11 December 1936, though the latter appointment only lasted until he was replaced in Paraguay by Albert Levame on 12 November 1939, while his Argentina posting lasted until 1953.

Pope Pius XII named him Nuncio to Italy on 26 January 1953, a post he held until he became a cardinal in 1958. He attempted to have diplomatic relations established between the Vatican and the Soviet Union.

Pope John XXIII created him Cardinal-Priest of San Paolo alla Regola in the consistory of 15 December 1958. Following the ancient custom revived by Pope Pius, Fietta received his cardinal's red biretta from Giovanni Gronchi, President of Italy, on 17 December.

In retirement he enjoyed strolling the streets of his native Ivrea and playing bocce with his friends.

Fietta died in Ivrea, at age 76, and is buried at its cathedral.

See also
Cardinals created by John XXIII

References

External links
Catholic-Hierarchy 
Cardinals of the Holy Roman Church

1883 births
1960 deaths
People from Ivrea
20th-century Italian cardinals
Pontifical Gregorian University alumni
Apostolic Nuncios to Haiti
Apostolic Nuncios to the Dominican Republic
Apostolic Nuncios to Argentina
Apostolic Nuncios to Paraguay
Apostolic Nuncios to Italy
Cardinals created by Pope John XXIII
Apostolic Nuncios to Costa Rica